A Processional is anything of, and or pertaining to a procession.

Processional may also refer to:

Processional (play), a 1925 play
Roman Processional, the tenth chapter of Rituale Romanum
Processional cross, a Crucifix held during a Christian procession
Processional walkway, a ceremonial walkway

Music
Processional hymn, a hymn or plainchant sung during a Christian procession
Processional, piano composition by George Crumb
Processional, organ composition by William Mathias (1934-1992)
Processional, orchestral composition by Arthur Bliss
Processional, organ composition by Grayston Ives

See also 
 Procession (disambiguation)